The 2020 Baltic Track Cycling Championships were held in Panevėžys, Lithuania on 8-9 of February 2020. Cyclists from Lithuania, Latvia and Estonia competed for the Baltic champions title.

Medallists

Men's

Women's

Medal table

References

External links 
 Lithuanian Cycling Federation

2020 in track cycling
Baltic Track
Cycle races in Lithuania
Sports competitions in Panevėžys
International cycle races hosted by Lithuania